Nadorozhny Lipovik is a rural locality (a village) in Komyanskoye Rural Settlement, Gryazovetsky District, Vologda Oblast, Russia. The population was 16 as of 2002.

Geography 
Nadorozhny Lipovik is located 36 km northeast of Gryazovets (the district's administrative centre) by road. Kashino is the nearest rural locality.

References 

Rural localities in Gryazovetsky District